This is a list of notable painters of Armenian descent.



A 
Ariel Agemian (1904-1963)
Stepan Aghajanian (1863-1940)
Karen Aghamyan (born 1946)
Simon Agopyan (1857-1921)
Martin Akoghlyan (born 1958)
Arturs Akopjans (born 1969)
Ivan Aivazovsky (1817-1900)
Yuhanna al-Armani (c.1720-1786)
Eduard Arakelyan (born 1950)
Maide Arel (1907-1997)
Eranuhi Aslamazyan (1910-1998)
Mariam Aslamazyan (1907-2006)
Charles Garabed Atamian (1872-1947)
Ashot Avagyan (born 1958)
Minas Avetisyan (1928-1975)
Teodor Axentowicz (1859-1938)
Edman Ayvazyan (1932–2020)

B 
Gevorg Bashinjagyan (1857-1925)
Zabelle C. Boyajian (1873-1957)

C 
Jean Carzou (1907-2000)
Edgar Chahine (1874-1947)
David Ciraciyan (1839-1907)
Mgirdic Civanian (1839-1907)
Mıgırdiç Civanyan (1848-1906)

D 
Sarkis Diranian (1854-1918)

E 
Robert Elibekyan (born 1941)
Sarkis Erganian (1870-1950)

G 

Haroutiun Galentz (1910-1967)
Vruir Galstian (1924-1996)
Paul Guiragossian (1926-1993)
Regina Ghazaryan (1915-1999)
Arshile Gorky (1904-1948)
Marcos Grigorian (1925-2007)
Sevada Grigoryan (born 1959)

H 
Hakob Hakobian (1923-2013)
Minas Halaj (born 1981)
Hovnatanian

I 
Eduard Isabekyan (1914-2007)

J
Jean Jansem (1920-2013)

K 
Zareh Kalfayan (1887-1939)
Emil Kazaz (born 1953)
Gayane Khachaturian (1942-2009)
Seiran Khatlamadjian (1937-1994)
Yervand Kochar (1899-1979)
Hakob Kojoyan (1883-1959)

L 
Levon Lachikyan

M 
Manas Family
Levon Manaseryan (1925–2019)
Vahram Manavyan (1880-1952)
Arman Manookian (1904-1931)
Ashot Melkonian (1930-2009)
Pharaon Mirzoyan (born 1949)
Zareh Moskofian (1898-1987)

N 
Koryun Nahapetyan (1926-1999)
Dmitriy Nalbandyan (1906-1993)
Yenovk Nazarian (1877-1928)

O 
Sarkis Ordyan (1918-2003)

P 
Hovsep Pushman (1877-1966)
Petros Petrosyan (1968-2012)
Arev Petrosyan (born 1972)
Arthur Pinajian (1914-1999)
Sargis Pitsak (14th Century)

R 
Toros Roslin (1210-1270)

S 
Karen Smbatyan (1932-2008)
Varaz Samuelian (1917-1995)
Maro Sargsyan (born 1973)
Arthur Sarkissian (born 1960)
Martiros Saryan (1880-1972)
Bedros Sirabyan (1833-1898)
Arshak Sarkissian (born 1981)
Carlos Sayadyan (born 1948)
Samvel Sevada (born 1949)
Shmavon Shmavonyan (born 1953)
Gagik Siravyan (born 1970)
Henrik Siravyan (1928-2001)
Vardges Sureniants (1860-1921)

T 
Yeghishe Tadevosyan (1870-1936)
Panos Terlemezian (1865-1941)
Tigran Tsitoghdzyan (born 1976)
Léon Arthur Tutundjian (1905-1968)

V 
Stepan Veranian (born 1955)
Yervant Voskan (1855-1914)
Shota Voskanyan (born 1960)

Y 
Garabet Yazmaciyan (1868-1929)
Anush Yeghiazaryan (born 1965)
Karapet Yeghiazaryan (1932-2006)

Z 
Sarkis Zabunyan (born 1938)
Zakar Zakarian (1849-1923)
Hovhannes Zardaryan (1918-1992)

Painters

Lists of painters by nationality